National Theater of the United States of America is a theatre company in New York City. The theatre has no connection with the American government, the name is intended to be humorous.

The troupe, founded in 2000, has been lauded by Gothamist as a "mischievous gang of innovators (that) represents some of the best attributes of downtown "experimental" theatre". The New York Times praised the troupe of having "stealthily become one of the most exciting and eccentric young theatre companies in town".

External links
 ntusa.org

References

Off-Broadway theaters
Theatre companies in New York (state)
2000 establishments in the United States